Antje Rehaag (born 1 August 1965) is a German former rower. She won gold with the women's eight at the 1994 World Rowing Championships in Indianapolis, USA, and competed in the women's eight event at the 1996 Summer Olympics.

Personal life
Rehaag is married to Dutch former rower and two-time Olympic gold medallist Ronald Florijn and is the mother of two Olympic rowers Karolien Florijn and Finn Florijn.

References

External links
 

1965 births
Living people
German female rowers
Olympic rowers of Germany
Rowers at the 1996 Summer Olympics
World Rowing Championships medalists for Germany
People from Main-Taunus-Kreis
Sportspeople from Darmstadt (region)
20th-century German women
21st-century German women